Robert Edward Gray is the former head men's soccer coach at Marshall University. He held that position from 1995 to 2016, compiling a 129-127-15 record. He led the Thundering Herd to three berths in the Conference USA tournament. He owns a career record of 384-203-40. In 2005, he led the Thundering Herd to a 4-3-2 record in its first season in Conference USA, and was named Conference USA coach of the year for his efforts. He holds the team's all-time record for most wins by a coach.

From 1992 to 1994, he served as the head men's soccer coach at the University of Mobile, where he compiled a 47-12-4 record. In 1994, he led the Rams to a 21–4 record, and an appearance in the NAIA national championship game. From 1978 to 1991, he served as the head men's soccer coach at Alderson-Broaddus College from 1978 to 1991. He guided that team to five appearances in the NAIA national tournament. His teams won 255 games at Alderson-Broaddus, and finished 2nd in the nation in 1981 and 1988, and 3rd in the nation in 1983 and 1991. He was named NSCAA national coach of the year in 1991. He earned five West Virginia Intercollegiate Athletic Conference coach of the year honors five times, and won the league championship seven times.

External links
http://herdzone.cstv.com/sports/m-soccer/mtt/gray_bob00.html

http://www.wvsoccer.net/

Marshall Thundering Herd men's soccer coaches
Living people
Place of birth missing (living people)
Alderson Broaddus Battlers men's soccer coaches
Alderson Broaddus Battlers men's soccer players
Mobile Rams men's soccer coaches
1952 births
American soccer coaches
Association footballers not categorized by position
Association football players not categorized by nationality